Oyster is a small unincorporated community on the Atlantic Coast of the Eastern Shore of the U.S. state of Virginia in Northampton County. It is at an elevation of 3 feet (1 m) above sea level.

Climate
The climate in this area is characterized by hot, humid summers and generally mild to cool winters.  According to the Köppen Climate Classification system, Oyster has a humid subtropical climate, abbreviated "Cfa" on climate maps.

See also
Anheuser–Busch Coastal Research Center

References

Unincorporated communities in Northampton County, Virginia
Unincorporated communities in Virginia
Eastern Shore of Virginia